John Young ( 1742 – 17 December 1835) was a British subject who became an important military advisor to Kamehameha I during the formation of the Kingdom of Hawaii. He was left behind by Simon Metcalfe, captain of the American ship Eleanora, and along with a Welshman Isaac Davis became a friend and advisor to Kamehameha. He brought knowledge of the western world, including naval and land battle strategies, to Kamehameha, and became a strong voice on affairs of state for the Hawaiian Kingdom. He played a big role during Hawaii's first contacts with the European powers. He spent the rest of his life in Hawaii. Between 1802 and 1812, John Young ruled as Royal Governor of Hawaii Island while King Kamehameha was away on other islands. He organized the construction of the fort at Honolulu Harbor. The Hawaiians gave him the name Olohana based on Young's typical command "All hands (on deck)".

Life
According to his tombstone, he was born in 1742 in Crosby, Lancashire, England. Other sources give his birth as 17 March 1744.
His father was Robert Young, also from Crosby, and mother Grace. He had two brothers: Peter and James.
The Youngs were of Scottish descent. After his death, two families from Massachusetts and Connecticut claimed that Young was American and a member of their family, but all contemporary sources seem to indicate he was British.

Young served as boatswain on the Eleanora, an American ship captained by Simon Metcalfe, engaged in the maritime fur trade between the Pacific Northwest and China. Sailing from Cape Cod in 1789, the Eleanora put in at Kealakekua Bay on the island of Hawaii in February 1790. Metcalfe waited for two days, but eventually sailed without Young. It was there that he met Isaac Davis, a Welshman who was the only surviving member of Fair Americans crew.

In battles such as the Battle of Nuʻuanu, when the army of Kamehameha conquered Oahu, Young had charge of the cannon. He is credited with firing the shot that put an end to Kaʻiana, who had seceded from the invading army en route and joined Kalanikūpule, king of Oahu and Maui. At the close of this contest, when Kamehameha was called back to Hawaii island to suppress the rebellion of Namakaeha, Young was left on Oahu to adjust the new regime's affairs, then with a number of foreigners who also joined Kamehameha at Hawaii island. Beginning about 1800 or 1802, he was appointed as the Royal Governor of Hawaii island after chief Mokuhia, whom Kamehameha had picked, was murdered by a rival.
This included his superintendency of tax gatherings when he returned to Kawaihae.

Young acted as interpreter for many English speaking visitors, and sowed the seeds of Christianity in Hawaii. When Captain Vancouver visited the island during the Vancouver Expedition in 1793, he offered to take Young and Davis back to Britain. But they were already content with their island life and refused the offer. Naturalist Archibald Menzies left seeds and plants such as citrus fruit in his care. He helped mediate a treaty with Britain in 1794, and coordinated the building of the first large European-style ships.

In 1803, Richard Cleveland, of the American ship Lelia Byrd, left a mare with foal with Young in Kawaihae. This was the first horse ever seen in the islands, and led eventually to the establishment of Parker Ranch. He took the first horses and cattle to Honolulu in 1809.

Young lived near Kealakekua Bay probably until about 1819, when Kamehameha I died.

Young built the first European-style house on the island of Hawaii, and its ruins are still to be seen at the Puʻukoholā Heiau National Historic Site near the town of Kawaihae. It was made of stone and Young had no tools but a hatchet and a wooden trowel. He made the door with a hatchet, hewing it out of a koa tree slab. He whitewashed the house with lime made from white coral fished from the sea.

Lucy Goodale Thurston, in her story of her life as a missionary in Hawaii, described Young:

He was one of the few close friends to be at Kamehameha's side when he died in 1819 at Kamakahonu.

Family

After the wars, Young returned to Kawaihae on the Big Island and expanded his compound, including building a small European-style fort. There he and wives raised a family and entertained both Hawaiian and western visitors.

His first marriage, in 1795, was to the chiefess Namokuelua of Oahu aristocracy. Their son, James Kānehoa, was an influential member of the court of Kamehameha II. On the king's 1823 visit to England, Kānehoa was entrusted with the official letters of introduction and served as translator. Kamehameha II, his queen and three other chiefs contracted measles and died abroad. Another son was Robert Young who was born in 1796, sent to school in America, fought for the American side in the War of 1812 and disappeared."Foreign Aide"  in Spirit of Aloha Magazine, by Carol Silva, May 2003

About 1805, Kamehameha's niece, Kaōanāeha, his favourite brother's daughter, became Young's second wife. This marriage brought him increased recognition and prestige.

Four children were born to John Young's second marriage. Fanny Kekelaokalani, his eldest daughter married George Naʻea and gave birth to a daughter, Emma, who would later marry King Kamehameha IV. Grace Kamaikui Young married Thomas Charles Byde Rooke and adopted her niece Emma. John Kalaipaihala Young Jr. known as Keoni Ana married Alapai and would become one of the only two males to hold the title of Kuhina Nui. Jane Lahilahi Young married Joshua Kaeo and gave birth to Peter Kaeo, a member of the House of Nobles. Jane also mothered an illegitimate son by Kamehameha III, Albert Kūnuiākea who might be the last direct descendant of Kamehameha I. His line is believed to have gone extinct.

In 1810, Young adopted his murdered companion Isaac Davis' children. They were Sally, thirteen years of age; George, 2 or 10 years old; and Betty, seven years of age.

Family tree

Death

During an illness in December 1835, his daughter Grace sent a ship to collect him and his wife Kaōanāeha. She transported them from Kawaihae on the Big Island to Honolulu, so Rooke could administer a heart medication and keep him under observation. He insisted on bringing his own coffin with him. "When I die, I don't want to leave any question about how I wished my body to be treated," he said. Fear of being murdered and having his body treated for burial in the old traditions, with the chiefs taking his bones to make icons or fishhooks, plagued his painful days and nights. Two weeks after his arrival on Oahu, Young died at Rooke House in Honolulu on 17 December 1835, at the age of 93 after living in Hawaii for 46 years. Grace sent for the family while the Oahu chiefs planned his funeral. His lands were divided among his children and the children of Isaac Davis whom he had adopted.

He was interred in the cemetery adjacent to the little coral mausoleum, called Pohukaina, on the Iolani Palace ground, on 18 December 1835. Later he was removed to the Royal Mausoleum of Hawaii at Mauna 'Ala'' on 16 May 1866. At the Royal Mausoleum, on a flat, grey stone which covers his grave, is the following inscription:

References

1740s births
1835 deaths
People from Crosby, Merseyside
People from Hawaii
Governors of Hawaii (island)
Hawaii (island)
Prisoners and detainees of the Hawaiian Kingdom
Hawaiian Kingdom politicians
Hawaiian Kingdom people of Scottish descent
Hawaiian Kingdom people
Burials at the Royal Mausoleum (Mauna ʻAla)
British expatriates in the Hawaiian Kingdom
Hawaiian nobility
Nobility of the Americas
Royalty of the Hawaiian Kingdom